The 2020–21 Cercle Brugge K.S.V. season was the club's 122nd season in existence and its 26th consecutive season in the top flight of Belgian football. In addition to the domestic league, Cercle Brugge participated in this season's edition of the Belgian Cup. The season covered the period from 1 July 2020 to 30 June 2021.

Players

First-team squad

On loan

Pre-season and friendlies

Competitions

Overview

Belgian First Division A

League table

Results summary

Results by round

Matches
The league fixtures were announced on 8 July 2020.

Belgian Cup

Statistics

Squad appearances and goals
Last updated on 17 January 2021.

|-
! colspan=14 style=background:#dcdcdc; text-align:center|Goalkeepers

|-
! colspan=14 style=background:#dcdcdc; text-align:center|Defenders

|-
! colspan=14 style=background:#dcdcdc; text-align:center|Midfielders

|-
! colspan=14 style=background:#dcdcdc; text-align:center|Forwards

|-
! colspan=14 style=background:#dcdcdc; text-align:center|Players who have made an appearance this season but have left the club

|}

References

External links

Cercle Brugge K.S.V. seasons
Cercle Brugge